Obřany Castle is a ruined castle near the town of Bystřice pod Hostýnem in the Zlín Region of the Czech Republic. It is classified as a cultural monument of the Czech Republic.

See also
List of castles in the Zlín Region

References

External links

 Obřany Castle at hrady.cz

Castles in the Zlín Region
Ruined castles in the Czech Republic